Stjarnan is an Icelandic sports club specialising in football located in Garðabær.During the 2017 campaign they will be competing in the following competitions: Úrvalsdeild, Icelandic Cup, Icelandic League Cup.

Squad

Competitions

Úrvalsdeild

League table

Results summary

Results by matchday

Results

Icelandic League Cup

Group stage

Icelandic Cup

UEFA Europa League

Qualifying rounds

Squad statistics

Appearances and goals

|-
|colspan="14"|Players away from the club on loan:
|-
|colspan="14"|Players who appeared for Stjarnan but left during the season:
|}

Goal scorers

Disciplinary record

References

External links
   
  Official football club website

Icelandic football club seasons